Jesse Bernard "Phantom" Barber (January 5, 1888 – October 21, 1959) was an American baseball outfielder in the Negro leagues. He played from 1909 to 1926 with several teams.

Barber played the majority of his career with the Bacharach Giants, Philadelphia Giants, and Chicago American Giants.

He died at the age of 71 in Bridgeport, Connecticut.

References

External links
 and Baseball-Reference Black Baseball Stats and Seamheads

1888 births
1959 deaths
Baseball outfielders
Philadelphia Giants players
Chicago American Giants players
Indianapolis ABCs players
Detroit Stars players
Hilldale Club players
Louisville White Sox (1914-1915) players
Club Fé players
San Francisco Park players
Baseball players from Virginia
Sportspeople from Charlottesville, Virginia
Sportspeople from Bridgeport, Connecticut
American expatriate baseball players in Cuba
20th-century African-American people